FC Locomotiva Basarabeasca is a Moldovan football club based in Basarabeasca, Moldova. Club was founded in 1995 and played 2 seasons in Moldovan National Division, the top division in Moldovan football.

Achievements
Divizia A
 Winners (1): 1995–96

References

External links
 Locomotiva Basarabeasca at WeltFussballArchive
 Locomotiva Basarabeasca at soccerway

Football clubs in Moldova
Association football clubs established in 1995